Constituency NA-130 (Lahore-XIII) was a constituency for the National Assembly of Pakistan. After the 2018 delimitations, its areas were divided among NA-128 (Lahore-VI) and NA-132 (Lahore-X).

Election 1990 
The elections were won by Ch. Ashiq Diyal by gaining 46,842 votes in 1990 by the IJI party.

Election 1997 
Again in 1997 election's Ch. Ashiq Diyal won the elections by gaining 28,589 votes and became the member of national assembly of Pakistan.

Election 2002 

General elections were held on 10 Oct 2002. Samina Khalid Ghurki of PPP won by 46,095 votes.

Election 2008 

General elections were held on 18 Feb 2008. Samina Khalid Ghurki of PPP won by 44,692 votes.

References

External links 
 Election result's official website

NA-130
Abolished National Assembly Constituencies of Pakistan